Växjö Marathon is an annual marathon running competition in Växjö, Sweden, organized by the local athletics club Växjö Löparklubb. The race was first held in 1994.

The race is currently the second largest marathon in Sweden with 303 starting runners 2008. Eight laps is run around the Växjö Lake on a flat course with 85% asphalt and 15% dirt road. Thanks to the cool temperature in October when it takes place and the easy course, the race is considered fast. The current race records are 2:27:59, set in 1999, and 2:50:36, set in 2008, for men and women respectively.

References

External links
 Official home page

Marathons in Sweden
Marathons in Europe
Athletics competitions in Sweden
1994 establishments in Sweden
Recurring sporting events established in 1994
Autumn events in Sweden